Urodacus varians is a species of scorpion in the Urodacidae family. It is endemic to Australia, and was first described in 1963 by Australian paleontologist and Western Australian Museum curator Ludwig Glauert.

Description
The holotype is 84 mm in length. Colouration is mainly light clay yellow.

Distribution and habitat
The species occurs in Western Australia. The type locality is the Canning Stock Route; it has also been recorded near Onslow in the Pilbara region.

References

 

 
varians
Scorpions of Australia
Endemic fauna of Australia
Fauna of Western Australia
Animals described in 1963
Taxa named by Ludwig Glauert